The Charles A. Brown House is a two-story home on 2420 Harrison Street, in Evanston, Illinois, designed in 1905 by American architect Frank Lloyd Wright. 

The building is a two-story clapboard home with four-bedrooms and one-bathroom on the second floor. The structure also has sash windows; one of the last times that the architect would make this choice for window design.

References

External links
 Exterior photographs of the Brown House from the Prairie School Traveler website
 Exterior photographs of the Brown House
 The Brown House seen on CBS News

Frank Lloyd Wright buildings
Houses completed in 1905
1905 establishments in Illinois